Topoľnica is a village and municipality in Galanta District of  the Trnava Region of south-west Slovakia.

Geography
The municipality lies at an elevation of 119 metres and covers an area of 10.475 km². It has a population of about 832 people.

History
In the 9th century, the territory of Topoľnica became part of the Kingdom of Hungary. In historical records the village was first mentioned in 1307. After the Austro-Hungarian army disintegrated in November 1918, Czechoslovak troops occupied the area, later acknowledged internationally by the Treaty of Trianon. Between 1938 and 1945 Topoľnica once more  became part of Miklós Horthy's Hungary through the First Vienna Award. From 1945 until the Velvet Divorce, it was part of Czechoslovakia. Since then it has been part of Slovakia.

References

External links
http://www.statistics.sk/mosmis/eng/run.html

Villages and municipalities in Galanta District